Stebbing Green is a hamlet in the Uttlesford district, in the county of Essex. It is near the village of Stebbing; its post town is Dunmow. It is near the B1256 road (Dunmow Road) and the main A120 road.

References
 Essex A-Z

Hamlets in Essex
Stebbing